Colodon is an extinct genus of herbivorous mammals that were related to tapirs of today.

Taxonomy
Species of Colodon were originally placed within the genus Lophiodon but were later found to be distinct.

Description
Colodon had small or absent canines and short, broad cheek teeth. The skull had a greatly enlarged narial incision and greatly reduced nasals. Similarities between the skulls of Colodon and true tapirs suggest it may have had a very small trunk as well.

Colodon first appeared in the Late Eocene and lasted until the Whitneyan.

References 

Prehistoric tapirs
Eocene odd-toed ungulates
Eocene mammals of North America
Oligocene odd-toed ungulates
Oligocene mammals of North America
Taxa named by Othniel Charles Marsh
Fossil taxa described in 1890